The 2013 Summer Deaflympics, officially known as the 22nd Summer Deaflympics, was an international multi-sport event that took place in Sofia, Bulgaria from July 26 to August 4, 2013. The marathon had been held before in Füssen, Germany on 21 July.
Sofia was hosting the biggest sports event for deaf athletes for a second time. In the past the Bulgarian capital hosted the 1993 Summer Deaflympics, thus becoming only the second city, together with Copenhagen, which has hosted two Summer Deaflympics.

The 2013 games was to be held in Athens, Greece, but the city decline the hosting rights citing no Organising Committee for the event and economic turmoil in the country.

Sports 
The sports offered at the 2013 Summer Deaflympics was held in 19 disciplines, including 14 individual sports and 5 team sports:

Individual sports

Team sports
 Basketball (2)
 Football (2)
 Handball (1)
 Volleyball (4)
 Beach (2)
 Indoor (2)

Venues 

 Armeets Arena was announced as the venue of the 2013 Summer Deaflympics opening and closing ceremonies in February 2013. It was also announced as venue of volleyball.
 Vasil Levski National Stadium  is the venue of athletics and football finals.
 Carlsberg National Tennis Center - Tennis
 Universiada Hall – Basketball
 Overgas Hall – Basketball
 Borisova gradina Velodrome – Cycling
 Winter Palace of Sports – Table tennis
 Mega Extreme Sky City Mall – Bowling
 Riu Resort and Spa Pravets – Football
 National Sports Academy – Beach volleyball, handball, karate, judo, taekwondo
 MoI Shooting Range Geo Milev – Shooting
 Spartak Sofia Aquatics Centre – Swimming
 Sofia Sports Hall – Table tennis
 Dema Sports Complex – Tennis
 Hristo Botev Hall – Badminton
 Zapaden Park – Orienteering
 Füssen Course – Marathon

Medal table

References

External links
International Committee of Sports for the Deaf
Official site for the 2013 Summer Deaflympics
Results site

 
Deaflympics
Sports competitions in Sofia
Summer Deaflympics
International sports competitions hosted by Bulgaria
Summer Deaflympics
Multi-sport events in Bulgaria
2010s in Sofia
July 2013 sports events in Europe
August 2013 sports events in Europe
Parasports in Bulgaria